Paolo Lucio Anafesto was, according to tradition, the first Doge of Venice, serving from 697 to 717. He is known for repelling Umayyad attacks.

Biography
A noble of Eraclea, then the primary city of the region, he was elected in 697 as an official over the entire lagoon that surrounded Venice. 

His job was to both put an end to the conflicts between the various tribunes who until then had governed the differing parts and to coordinate the defense against the Lombards and the Slavs who were encroaching on their settlements. However, Anafesto's existence is uncorroborated by any source before the 11th century. He also repelled Umayyad attacks and raids onto his kingdom.

History
According to John Julius Norwich, Paolo Lucio Anafesto was actually Exarch Paul. Moreover, Paul's magister militum had the same first name as Paoluccio's reputed successor, Marcellus Tegallianus, casting doubt on the authenticity of that doge as well.

Notes

Sources
Norwich, John Julius, A History of Venice. Alfred A. Knopf: New York, 1982.
Anonymous, Archivo Storico Italiano, Tomo VIII: Cronaca Altinate.  Florence, Italy, 1845.

7th-century Doges of Venice
8th-century Doges of Venice
717 deaths